AngloMockBa is an international/British-Russian festival of arts, fashion, film, media, music, ideas, and literature to be held in Moscow from 1–3 May.

It is understood to be the second edition of the Jewel of Russia Festival. According to the festival website, AngloMockBa is sponsored by TIME, Swissotel, and BMI. Guests include leading British and Russian cultural and media personalities such as Michael Nyman, Martha Fiennes, Gavin Turk, Michael Craig-Martin, Stephen Jones, Andrei Konchalovsky, Masha Tsigal, William Orbit, Henry Holland, Dylan Jones, and Stephen Frears.

The festival is directed by Liberatum and Red Square PR.

External links
AngloMockBa Liberatum Website
AngloMockBa Red Square PR Website
AngloMockBa Official Blog

Russian culture
Festivals in Russia
Russian music
Russian literature
Russian art